Richard Jenkins (born 1947) is an American actor.

Richard Jenkins may also refer to:

Richard L. Jenkins (1903–1991), American child psychiatrist
Richard Jenkins (engineer) (born 1977), British engineer
Richard Jenkins (MP) (1785–1853), Member of Parliament for Shrewsbury
Richard Jenkins (RCMP) interrogated Abdullah Khadr while he was in a secret prison in Pakistan
Richard Lewis Jenkins (1815–1883), New South Wales politician
Richard Jenkins (sociologist) (born 1952)

See also
Richard Jenkyns (1782–1854), British academic administrator and Dean of Wells
Richard Burton (1925–1984), Welsh actor whose birth name was Richard Walter Jenkins Jr.